Olga Orlova  may refer to:

 Olga Orlova (Russian figure skater) (born 1986)
 Olga Orlova (Ukrainian figure skater) (born 1984)
 Olga Orlova (singer) (born 1977), Russian singer, founding member of Blestyashchiye
 Olga Orlova (animator) (1932 - 2022) see Nu, pogodi!